Oud-Alblas is a village in the Dutch province of South Holland. It is a part of the municipality of Molenlanden, and lies about 6 km north of Dordrecht.

In 2001, the village of Oud-Alblas had 1291 inhabitants. The built-up area of the village was 0.19 km², and contained 455 residences.
The statistical area "Oud-Alblas", which also can include the peripheral parts of the village, as well as the surrounding countryside, has a population of around 2250.

Oud-Alblas was a separate municipality until 1986, when it became part of Graafstroom. Since 2013 Graafstroom has made part of the new municipality of Molenwaard.

References

Former municipalities of South Holland
Populated places in South Holland
Molenlanden